The Modern Adventures of Casanova was a 1952 Mutual radio show starring Errol Flynn. Flynn played a modern-day descendant of Casanova who actually works for Interpol. The program was written, produced, and directed by William N. Robson. Walter Schumann provided the music.

Selected episodes
Episode 1 – premiere – 3 January 1952 – set in Venice Italy
Episode 2 – "The Phony Count" – 10 January 1952 – Casanova saves a woman from a phony count
Episode 3 – "Family Vendetta" – 17 January 1952 – Casanova visits Venice and deals with the Marchetties, enemies of the Casanovas
Episode 4–24 January 1952 – while skiing in Switzerland, Casanova helps play cupid for a younger couple
Episode 5–31 January 1952
Episode 6–7 February 1952
Episode 7–14 February 1952 – Casanova helps on Valentine's Day
Episode 8–21 February 1952
Episode 9–28 February 1952
Episode 10–6 March 1952
Episode 11–13 March 1952
Episode 12–20 March 1952
Episode 13–27 March 1952 – Casanova tracks down a dope smuggling ring in Paris
Episode 14 – "The Bride of the Rain God" – 3 April 1952 – Casanova investigates a cursed relic from the Mayan civilisation responsible for killing people
Episode 15–10 April 1952 – Casanova investigates a pair of con artists on the French riviera
Episode 16–17 April 1952 – Casanova smashes a gold smuggling syndicate
Episode 17 – "The Black Dowry Pearls" – 24 April 1952 – Casanova goes to Venice to retrieve some pearls from Phillip II
Episode 18–1 May 1952
Episode 19–8 May 1952
Episode 20–15 May 1952 – Casanova goes to Egypt to stop a drug smuggling ring
Episode 21 – "The Missing Arm of Venus de Milo" – 22 May 1952 – Christopher Casanova is sent to Jamaica to recover the missing arm of the Venus de Milo.
Episode 22–29 May 1952
Episode 23–5 June 1952
Episode 24–12 June 1952
Episode 25–19 June 1952
Episode 26–26 June 1952 – Casanova investigates the murder of a beauty in Paris
Episode 27 – first of season two – 2 October 1952
Episode 28 – "The Sumatra Adventure" – 9 October 1952
Episode 29–16 October 1952
Episode 30–23 October 1952
Episode 31 – "The Gold Brick Swindle" – 30 October 1952 – Casanova goes to Karachi
Episode 32–6 November 1952
Episode 33–13 November 1952
Episode 34–20 November 1952 
Episode 35 – "The Star of Thessaly" – 27 November 1952 – Casanova guards an old Greek millionaire who is visiting Paris with a diamond
Episode 36–4 December 1952
Episode 37–11 December 1952
Episode 38
Episode 39

Reception
The critic from the Chicago Daily Tribune said that "this swashbuckling mademoiselle chaser reads a script loaded with improbable situations, double entendres and what I suppose is Riviera playboy talk."

References

External links
Episode log at The Digital Deli

1950s American radio programs
Mutual Broadcasting System programs